Harpalus medvedevi is a species of ground beetle in the subfamily Harpalinae. It was described by Kataev in 2006.

References

medvedevi
Beetles described in 2006